Those Who Love is a biographical novel of John Adams, as told from the perspective of his wife, Abigail Adams.  It was written by American author Irving Stone.

Notes

1965 American novels
American historical novels
Novels by Irving Stone
Doubleday (publisher) books
Love stories